Family with sequence similarity 118, member B is a protein that in humans is encoded by the FAM118B gene.

References

Further reading 

Genes on human chromosome 11